Vibriobactin is a catechol siderophore that helps the microbial system to acquire iron. It was first isolated from Vibrio cholerae.

Structure and biosynthesis
The components of vibriobactin are three 2,3-dihydroxybenzoic acid (DHB), two threonine (Thr), and one norspermidine (NSPD). DHB is synthesized from chorismic acid by a series of enzymes: VibA, VibB, and VibC. DHB is linked to NSPD by VibE, VibB and VibH in order and forms DHB-NSPD. On the other hand, DHB performs condensation and cyclization with Thr by VibE, VibB, and VibF to form the heterocyclic molecule linked on VibF: DHB-Thr-VibF. DHB-NSPD and DHB-Thr-VibF are then put together by VibF to form vibriobactin.

References

Oxazolines
Benzamides
Siderophores